The Cathedral Quartet, also known as the Cathedrals, was an American southern gospel quartet who performed from 1964 to December 1999. The group's final lineup consisted of Glen Payne (lead), George Younce (bass), Ernie Haase (tenor), Scott Fowler (baritone and bass guitar), and Roger Bennett (piano and rhythm guitar).

History

Formation and early years
The Cathedrals formed in 1963 as a trio consisting of the California Weatherford Quartet lead singer Glen Payne, tenor Bobby Clark, and baritone Danny Koker. Initially a house group of Rex Humbard's Cathedral of Tomorrow, they called themselves the Cathedral Trio. The group became a quartet with the addition of Blue Ridge Quartet bass singer George Younce in 1964. They decided to become a full-time touring group in 1969, leaving the Cathedral of Tomorrow. Koker and Clark left the group to pursue other interests, and were replaced by tenor Mack Taunton and baritone-pianist George Amon Webster. The group signed with Canaan Records; Canaan producer Marvin Norcross worked with them and Florida Boys lead singer Les Beasley to help the group gain exposure. Norcross gave them performance time on the nationally syndicated television Gospel Singing Jubilee. With Canaan, the group experimented with different styles of dress and performance to find their identity.

Rise to prominence
Gospel singer Bill Gaither invited the group to perform at his annual Praise Gathering in Indianapolis, and they received more requests for appearances. Gaither collaborated with Younce and Payne to produce their future albums for Word Records. The group began incorporating Younce and Payne's comedy routines, and added Roy Tremble as a tenor. Tremble, Webster, and pianist Lorne Matthews left the group and started their own trio in 1979. Their first replacement, Kirk Talley of the Hoppers, was a tenor; Steve Lee was added to sing baritone and play piano. Shortly before 1980, the group hired Roger Bennett as their pianist after hearing him play for their opening act. Lee left the group, and former member Roger Horne filled in briefly before bass guitarist and Kingsmen baritone Mark Trammell joined the group. They left Canaan (Word), and signed with Riversong (Benson).

1980s
Kirk Talley left the group in the fall of 1983 to form the Talleys with his brother, Roger, and sister-in-law, Debra. Danny Funderburk of the Singing Americans was chosen to replace him in December of that year. This lineup remained in place for several years, until Roger Bennett left to help found Journey Records. Bennett was replaced by young, classically trained pianist and vocalist Gerald Wolfe. With Wolfe at the piano and singing, the group contributed to Symphony of Praise a 1987 album with the London Philharmonic Orchestra. The album included "This Ole House", "Champion Of Love", "I Can See The Hand" (written by Steven Curtis Chapman), and "I've Just Started Living". During this period, the group added Trammell's bass guitar and a synthesizer to its quartet vocals.

1990s: Gaither Homecoming years
In February 1990, Funderburk left to help form the quartet Perfect Heart. The Cathedrals hired tenor Kurt Young to replace him, but Young left the quartet after two months. Young was replaced by Ernie Haase, a young tenor from Indiana. Later that year, Trammell left to form Greater Vision with Gerald Wolfe. Scott Fowler, former lead singer of the Sound, became the quartet's baritone and bass guitarist; this was the final version of the Cathedrals. The full group (including present and former members) recorded a concert, The Cathedral Quartet: A Reunion, in 1995.

Bill Gaither and the Gaither Vocal Band recorded Homecoming, a tribute to Southern gospel music, during the early 1990s. Gaither enlisted George Younce and Glen Payne for the album (which inspired the Gaither Homecoming videos), and the Cathedral Quartet was included on later videos in the series. In addition to touring and appearing in the Gaither Homecoming videos, the group appeared three times on NBC's Today show during the decade.

Final years and farewell tour
Younce and Payne's health began to decline; Younce had kidney failure and heart disease by 1999, and Payne was diagnosed with liver cancer. They decided to disband the group after a farewell tour, as the group's health permitted. The Gaithers and the Cathedrals recorded a live Cathedrals Farewell Celebration video on May 18, 1999, on which they were joined by The Statler Brothers, The Oak Ridge Boys, Sandi Patty, Guy Penrod, and the Gaither Vocal Band. The Cathedrals would make their final appearance at the National Quartet Convention without Payne. During a performance Payne called via telephone from his hospital bed, he sang the song I Won't Have to Cross Jordan Alone to which the audience gave him a standing ovation at the end. On October 15, 1999, Glen Payne died from liver cancer at aged 72. After Glen's death, Roger Bennett sung Glen's part until the group final concert on December 11, 1999, in Akron, Ohio.

After the group
In 2000, former Cathedrals Scott Fowler and Roger Bennett formed the Southern gospel group Legacy Five; Fowler was the lead singer and bass guitarist, and Bennett was the group's emcee and pianist. Haase continued a solo career he had begun and, with Gaither's help, formed The Old Friends Quartet with Younce, Jake Hess, Wesley Pritchard, and Gold City alumnus Garry Jones on piano. They recorded two albums and a concert video for the Gaither Homecoming series, but Younce and Hess's poor health brought an end to the Old Friends two years later. In 2003, Haase and Garry Jones formed the Signature Sound Quartet. After Jones and Haase developed artistic differences, Jones left. The Signature Sound became associated with Gaither and his Homecoming tour, and changed its name to Ernie Haase & Signature Sound.

After leaving the Cathedrals, Mark Trammell was the original baritone of Greater Vision before leaving to join Gold City. In 2002, Trammell formed his own quartet called Mark Trammell Quartet. Gerald Wolfe is emcee and piano player with Greater Vision and Danny Funderburk has recorded solo and has been in several groups since leaving Perfect Heart. Kirk Talley had a solo career from the Talleys breakup to December 2012, when he developed vocal problems. On April 11, 2005, George Younce died from kidney failure, aged 75. On March 17, 2007, Roger Bennett died at the age of 48 after battling 11 and a half year of leukemia. Ernie Haase & Signature Sound released A Tribute to the Cathedral Quartet in 2010, a nominee for Southern Gospel Album of the Year at the 42nd GMA Dove Awards.

Members

Backing musicians
George Amon Webster: bass guitar (1971, 1974–79)
Steve Lee: bass guitar (1979–80)
Kirk Talley: bass guitar (1979–83)
Victor Clay: rhythm guitar (occasional appearances from 1964)
Roger Bennett: rhythm guitar (1985)
Robbie Willis: drums (occasionally)

Timeline

Cathedrals Family Reunion members

Discography

Albums 
 1963: Introducing the Cathedral Trio
 1963: When the Saints Go Marching In
 1964: Beyond the Sunset
 1965: Taller Than Trees
 1965: Presenting the Cathedral Quartet, Mariner’s Quartet, Gospel Harmony Boys
 1965: The Cathedral Quartet with Strings
 1966: The Cathedral Quartet with Brass
 1966: Greatest Gospel Hits
 1966: Land of the Bible
 1967: I Saw the Light
 1968: Family Album
 1968: Focus On Glen Payne
 1969: Jesus is Coming Soon
1970: I’m Nearer Home1970: It’s Music Time1970: A Little Bit of Everything1971: Everything’s Alright1971: Somebody Loves Me1971: Right On1972: Welcome to Our World1973: Seniors in Session1973: Town and Country1973: The Last Sunday1974: Our Statue of Liberty1974: Live in Concert1975: Plain Ole Gospel1975: For Keeps1976: The Cathedral Quartet Sings Albert E. Brumley Classics1976: Easy on the Ears, Heavy on the Heart1977: Then and Now1978: One at a Time1978: The Cathedral Quartet Featuring Oh, What a Love1978: Sunshine And Roses1979: You Ain’t Heard Nothing Yet1979: Then I Found Jesus1979: Live With The Cathedral Quartet1979: Keep On Singing (2 Versions)
 1979 Smooth as Silk 1980 Interwoven 1980 Better Than Ever 1980 Telling the World About His Love 1981 Cherish That Name 1981 Colors of His Love 1982 Something Special 1982 Greater 1982 Oh Happy Day 1983 Individually 1983 Voices in Praise/A Cappella 1983 Favorites Old and New 1983 Live in Atlanta 1983 Featuring George Younce 1983 Featuring Glen Payne 1984 Distinctively 1984 The Prestigious Cathedral Quartet 1985 An Old Convention Song 1985 Especially For You 1985 A Cathedral Christmas A Cappella 1986 Master Builder 1986 Travelin’ Live 1987 Land Of Living 1987 Symphony of Praise 1988 Goin’ In Style 1989 25th Anniversary 1990 Climbing Higher and Higher 1991 The Best of Times 1992 Camp Meeting (Live) 1993 High and Lifted Up 1998 Faithful1999: A Farewell Celebration1999: Live in Jacksonville2012: Moody Radio Presents... Live In Chicago (recorded live in 1996)
2013: Cathedrals Family Reunion2014: Cathedrals Family Reunion: Past Members Reunite Live In ConcertCompilations
1998: 20 Gospel Classics (Landmark)
2000: Convention Classics (Diamante)
2000: Signature Songs, Vol. 1 (Homeland)
2001: Cherish That Name (Cathedral)
2002: Signature Songs, Vol. 2 (Homeland)
2002: Years Gone By, Vol 1 (Homeland)
2002: The Best of the Cathedrals (Canaan)
2003: Live in Concert: Live With the Cathedral Quartet'' (Cathedral)

References

External links
Cathedrals History and Discography

American Christian musical groups
Gospel quartets
Musical groups disestablished in 1999
Musical groups established in 1964
Musical groups from Ohio
Southern gospel performers